The Technological University of the Mixteca (UTM), is a Mexican public university belonging to the SUNEO. UTM is located in Huajuapan de León, Oaxaca, region of La Mixteca, Mexico. Its main areas of focus include: teaching, research, cultural diffusion and economic development.

External links
Technological University of the Mixteca

References

Universities and colleges in Oaxaca
Educational institutions established in 1990
Liberal arts colleges
Public universities and colleges in Mexico
1990 establishments in Mexico